The Lieutenant Governor of the Isle of Man ( or Lhiass-chiannoort Vannin) is the Lord of Mann's official personal representative in the Isle of Man. He has the power to grant royal assent and is styled "His Excellency".

In recent times the governor has been either a retired diplomat or a senior military officer. No Manx-born person has ever been appointed lieutenant governor, although Manx-born first deemsters (ex officio deputy governors) have taken on the role temporarily during an interregnum between governors, and during periods when the lieutenant governor is off-island.

The official residence of the governor is Government House, Governor's Road, Onchan.

In the past, the lieutenant governor wielded considerable judicial, fiscal and executive power on the island. However, the office lost his prerogatives as Head of the Judiciary in 1921, as Head of Government in 1961, as president of the Legislative Council in 1980 and finally as president of Tynwald in 1990. Today the role of lieutenant governor is essentially ceremonial, although certain powers under Isle of Man legislation do still fall to the governor or governor-in-council (a decision on the advice, and with the approval of, the Council of Ministers).

History
It was often asked what was the proper title of the chief executive of the Island, and whether there were any words in the Commissions of the lieutenant governors which suspended their functions during the presence in the Island of the lord of Mann or a governor of the Isle of Man. Such a question was considered in 1877 by the eminent Manx advocate James Gell, who referred to a search he undertook at the Rolls Office, the results of which are included in a list of 83 appointments of governors between 1595 and 1863. Not all appointments during that period are listed in this article as it was difficult to trace appointments prior to 1639; at about that time the practice began of keeping a distinct book for the enrolment of commissions. In addition, after that date certain commissions were also omitted to be enrolled. For instance no record of the appointment of John Murray, 4th Duke of Atholl as governor in 1793 could be traced.

Historically the designations "governor", "lieutenant" (that is, the king's or queen's or lord of Mann's lieutenant) and "captain" were synonymous. Only one reference to deputy lieutenant is made, that of Governor Horton's appointment in 1725. In some commissions expressions designating the office, such as governor; captain general and commander-in-chief; chief governor and commander-in-chief; chief governor; and governor-in-chief and captain general; may well imply the conferring of powers, civil and military, though the designation given may possibly affect the rank of the person appointed, as between himself and others holding similar or analogous appointments.

If the sovereign intended not to bestow the full powers of a governor on a specific person, then the limitations had to be expressed on the face of the commission. However no record of such an amendment exists, and although any legal power exercised could not be questioned as to its legality by any subject, a governor as between himself and the Crown, would be controlled as to the exercise of his powers by his instructions and would therefore be accountable for any injudicious use of them.

A lieutenant governor or deputy governor having a commission with no express limitation to their powers, could perform all the functions of a governor while his powers were in force.

James Gell twice held the office of governor of the Isle of Man: first during the illness of Lord Henniker, Gell being appointed deputy and presiding at Tynwald; and second during the interregnum between Lord Henniker's death and the appointment of Lord Raglan.

Whilst Gell was appointed deputy governor on the first occasion, he was appointed acting governor in the second instance, an important distinction. The Dukes of Atholl were the last supreme governors of the Isle of Man, until the Isle of Man Purchase Act 1765, also known as the Act of Revestment.  All governors since then had been lieutenant governors, but Gell's appointment as acting governor was on a par with the position of the Duke of Atholl, and he had the right to appoint a lieutenant governor had he so wished. So his office as acting governor carried with it greater authority than that of lieutenant governor; this fact Gell himself pointed out to the Home Office.

The term "lieutenant governor" was not used before the Act of Revestment in 1765; the term "deputy governor" was used instead. The appointments of Peter Legh (1596), Ratcliffe Gerrard (1639), Roger Nowell (1660), William Sacheverell (1692), Thomas Huddlestone (1700) and Alexander Horne (1713) as deputy governors can therefore be seen as temporary appointments during a vacancy.

Lieutenant governors and deputy governors could exercise the powers of a governor of the Isle of Man in one respect: they could appoint deputies. In the cases of Charles Stanley (1702) and Bishop Isaac Barrow (1774) this prerogative was specifically granted; however over time it became common custom amongst successive lieutenant governors. This would allow governors to appoint deputies for specific periods or purposes, such as during the governor's absence on specified occasions, or during his illness when not absent; the list below illustrates this and shows the great number of appointments made by governors of deputies during their absence. For instance the various appointments of Deemsters McYlrea and Taubman can be seen as examples of appointments for executing judicial functions.

Before the Act of Revestment, deputies were expressly appointed to act during absence, except in one case: that of Bishop Isaac Barrow in 1664. In this case, the deputy governor, Roger Nowell, acted whilst Governor Barrow was on the island, sometimes along with him and sometimes solely. This was an exceptional case; it was probably not intended that the Bishop have more to do with temporal affairs than was absolutely necessary.

After Revestment, the appointments of Lieutenant Governors Henry Hope (1773), Richard Dawson (1775 and 1777), Alexander Shaw (1790), Henry Murray (1804) and Cornelius Smelt (1805) were also expressly held during the absence of the governors.
The appointments of Lieutenant Governors John Ready (1832), Charles Hope (1845) and Francis Pigott Stainsby Conant (1860), say nothing as to the presence of a governor-in-chief, and these three persons were therefore appointed to be "merely" lieutenant governors. It may be the case with the appointment of Colonel Ready that it was not intended for him to take the office of governor-in-chief, and therefore no allusion was made in the commissions of the lieutenant governors to their office. However, it appears that without any words expressly suspending the functions of a lieutenant governor, they would as a matter of course be suspended.

Appointment
Before 2010 the lieutenant governor was appointed by the Crown on the advice of a panel led by the Government of the United Kingdom. In July 2010 the Government of the Isle of Man announced that the next lieutenant governor would be appointed on the advice of an entirely local panel, comprising the Chief Minister, the President of Tynwald and the First Deemster. The new procedure was used for the first time a few months later to choose Paul Haddacks's successor.

Proposed change to title 
In October 2005 Tynwald sought to change the title of the lieutenant governor to Crown Commissioner.  This proposal was sent to the British Department of Constitutional Affairs for submission to Queen Elizabeth II, Lord of Mann, for approval. However, in April 2006, after much public disapproval, Tynwald reversed its proposal and withdrew its request for royal assent. Thus the lieutenant governor's title remained unchanged.

List of governors

References

See also 

Governors of the Isle of Man
King of Mann
Lord of Mann

Isle of Man, Lieutenant Governors
Lieutenant Governors of the Isle of Man, List of
Lieutenant Governors of the Isle of Man, List of